WBCL is an FM radio station located in Fort Wayne, Indiana. The station operates on the FM radio frequency of 90.3 MHz. WBCL is owned by Taylor University in Upland, Indiana with its studios located at the university's Fort Wayne campus.

Its current programming consists of Christian adult contemporary music.

Repeaters and translators
WBCL maintains a network of repeaters and translators that enable its signal to reach a wide geographical area.  WBCL's signal extends beyond Fort Wayne into Northwest Ohio and Southern Michigan, extending to Toledo, Lima, and almost to Detroit.

 WBCW 89.7 FM in Upland, Indiana
 WBCJ 88.1 FM in Spencerville, Ohio
 WBCY 89.5 FM in Archbold, Ohio
 WCVM 94.7 in Bronson, Michigan
 WTPG 88.9 in Whitehouse, Ohio
 W291AH 106.1 FM in Muncie, Indiana
 W249BT 97.7 in Adrian, Michigan
 W258CE 99.5 in Findlay, Ohio
 W267BN 101.3 in Marion, Indiana

External links
Official WBCL website (with streaming audio)

Lima, Ohio
Taylor University
BCL
Radio stations established in 1976
1976 establishments in Indiana
Contemporary Christian radio stations in the United States
BCL